Robert M. Dyer is an American politician currently serving as the Mayor of Virginia Beach, Virginia. Prior to being elected mayor, he served as a member of the city council for 14 years. Dyer has also been a physical therapist for over 40 years and a professor of government at his alma mater, Regent University. He won the November 2018 election for mayor despite being outraised by his opponent Ben Davenport nearly 5 to 1.

Dyer ran for re-election for mayor in 2020. On June 9, 2020, Jody Wagner announced she would run for the seat; Dyer's previous opponent, City Councilman Aaron Rouse, ended his campaign on May 30, 2020. Dyer won a second term as mayor against Wagner in the November 2020 election.

See also
 List of mayors of the 50 largest cities in the United States

References

External links
 Bobby Dyer for Mayor

1950 births
21st-century American politicians
Fairleigh Dickinson University alumni
Living people
Mayors of Virginia Beach, Virginia
Regent University alumni
Saint Louis University alumni
Virginia Republicans